Bhandari is a village in Osmanabad Taluka in Osmanabad District in Maharashtra State, India.

Villages in Osmanabad district